The elegant parrot (Neophema elegans) is a species of parrot in the family Psittaculidae.
It is endemic to Australia.

Naming and taxonomy
The elegant parrot was called carteri, bilgir, or koolyederong by Aboriginal peoples. Its English name came from the renowned ornithologist and artist John Gould in 1837, its specific name Latin for "elegant". It is one of six species of grass parrot in the genus Neophema, and within it a member of the subgenus Neonanodes. Its common name is elegant parrot, but it has also been called elegant parakeet, elegant grass parakeet, and grass parrot in the past.

Description
The female is a duller shade of olive all over and has a narrower blue frontal band. The wings are predominantly olive with outer flight feathers dark blue. The yellow-edged tail has shades of olive and blue. The bill and legs are grey and the eyes dark brown. Juveniles are duller and lack the frontal bands.

Distribution and habitat
The elegant parrot is found in two disjunct regions, one across southwestern Australia from Moora in the north to Merredin and Esperance in the east, and in southeastern South Australia (including Kangaroo Island) north to Marree, and east into western Victoria.

Breeding
Breeding season is anywhere from July to November or after rainfall, with one or occasionally two broods raised depending on rainfall.

Gallery

References

elegant parrot
Birds of South Australia
Birds of Western Australia
Endemic birds of Australia
elegant parrot
Taxonomy articles created by Polbot